"How Many Times" is the third single by from DJ Khaled's eighth studio album I Changed a Lot (2015).

It features Chris Brown, Lil Wayne and Big Sean, and was released on May 12, 2015, as the third single from the album.

Music video
A music video for the song was released on May 11, 2015. This video was famously known for featuring Khaled saying "Another one!" when demanding another kiss from a woman in the video. Ace Hood makes a cameo. This quote would then quickly evolve into a meme and has since then been featured in many of Khaled's later singles, most notably For Free, which features Canadian entertainer Drake, and in Do You Mind, which features Nicki Minaj, Chris Brown, August Alsina, Jeremih, Future, and Rick Ross.

Charts

Certifications

References 

2015 singles
2015 songs
DJ Khaled songs
Big Sean songs
Lil Wayne songs
Chris Brown songs
Republic Records singles
Songs written by Chris Brown
Songs written by Big Sean
Songs written by Lil Wayne
Songs written by Lee on the Beats
Songs written by DJ Khaled
Songs written by Bkorn
Songs written by Oz (record producer)